Cassius Clay (soon Muhammad Ali) fought an eight-round boxing match with LaMar Clark in Louisville on April 19, 1961. Clark had entered the ring with a formidable reputation of knocking out 45 of his previous opponents. However, Clay broke Clark's nose in the fight and won the bout through a knockout in the second round following which Clark retired from boxing.

References

Clark
1961 in boxing
Sports competitions in Louisville, Kentucky
1961 in sports in Kentucky
April 1961 sports events in the United States